William Cochran (1751 – May 31, 1820) was an Irish-born merchant and political figure in Nova Scotia. He represented Halifax Township in the Nova Scotia House of Assembly from 1785 to 1806.

He was the son of Joseph Cochran and settled in Halifax. Cochran died in Truro, Nova Scotia.

His brother Thomas Cochran also served in the provincial assembly.

References 
 A Directory of the Members of the Legislative Assembly of Nova Scotia, 1758-1958, Public Archives of Nova Scotia (1958)

1751 births
1820 deaths
Nova Scotia pre-Confederation MLAs